Streptomyces sioyaensis is a bacterium species from the genus of Streptomyces which has been isolated from soil. Streptomyces sioyaensis produces siomycine and altemicidin.

Further reading

See also 
 List of Streptomyces species

References

External links
Type strain of Streptomyces sioyaensis at BacDive -  the Bacterial Diversity Metadatabase	

sioyaensis
Bacteria described in 1961